Gregory Goodman is an American film producer.

Filmography
He was a producer in all films unless otherwise noted.

Film

Production manager

Miscellaneous crew

Second unit director or assistant director

Thanks

References

External links

American film producers
Living people
Year of birth missing (living people)